Qian Qianyi (1582–1664) was a Chinese historian, poet, and politician during the late Ming dynasty. Qian was a famous author and poet; and along with Gong Dingzi and Wu Weiye was known as one of the Three Masters of Jiangdong.

Biography
Qian was born in Changshu county of Suzhou prefecture (now in Jiangsu province). His courtesy name was "Shouzhi" and his pseudonyms were "Muzhai" and later "Mengsou". He passed the imperial examination in 1610 at the age of 28.

Qian knew many independent women from entertainment and artistic circles, whom he treated as equals. One was Ma Ruyu from Nanking, a consummate actress. She had had a good formal education. In addition she could paint and produce calligraphy in the square style. In her time she intimidated the male literati around her. Like many others of her kind, she abandoned her stage life and took up religion, building a Buddhist retreat. Another was Liu Rushi (1618–1684), who became his consort after he was impressed by her accomplishments. He treated her as his intellectual equal and companion on travels and social gatherings. Her poetry was preserved by Qian. Qian had important ties to the local writers and artists in the Jiading and Kunshan area outside modern Shanghai. In one case, he assisted Liu Rushi's fellow courtesan Dong Xiaowan to marry a nobleman by paying off her 3,000 gold taels worth of debt and having her name struck from the musicians register.

Preceding this generation of individuals was the prose master Gui Youguang (1507–1571) who opposed the classicists headed by Wang Shizhen (1526–1590). The antagonism to the classicist school would continue throughout the life and writings of Qian Qianyi himself.

In 1644, Qian taught an excellent student in Nanjing: Koxinga (Zheng Chenggong), who would later defeat and expel the Dutch from Taiwan.

Works

His principal work and contribution to period history was the Liechao shiji 列朝詩集 (Lieh-ch'ao shih-chi), originally a lengthy anthology of poetry with attached biographies. At present the biographies alone are printed and the work has become an unmatched history of individuals from the middle and lower strata of 16th- and 17th-century Chinese society. His father gave him special instruction in historic classics. Qian showed an early interest in the classic Shishuo xinyu, a work of historical anecdotes. Like Qian Qianyi himself, others of his circle were closely involved in education and the revival of the study of antiquity as the basis of learning. Qian's Liechao shiji was published by his associate and printer Mao Jin, who like Qian himself, showed a concern for poorer scholars. Mao used money from his printing for charitable work and needy scholars.

References

Citations

Sources 

 Carpenter, Bruce E., "Ch'ien Ch'ien-i and Social History", Tezukayama University Review (Tezukayama daigaku ronshū, Nara, Japan, 1987, no. 58, pp. 101–113. ISSN 0385-7743
 
 Ci hai bian ji wei yuan hui. Ci hai. Shanghai: Shanghai ci shu chu ban she, 1979.
 
 Zhang, Hongsheng (2002). "Gong Dingzi and the Courtesan Gu Mei:  Their Romance and the Revival of the Song Lyric in the Ming-Qing Transition", in Hsiang Lectures on Chinese Poetry, Volume 2, Grace S. Fong, editor. (Montreal: Center for East Asian Research, McGill University).

Further reading

1582 births
1664 deaths
17th-century Chinese historians
17th-century Chinese poets
Burials in Suzhou
Historians from Jiangsu
Ming dynasty historians
Ming dynasty poets
People from Changshu
Poets from Jiangsu
Politicians from Suzhou
Qing dynasty historians
Qing dynasty poets
Writers from Suzhou
Donglin partisans